Sports Stars of Tomorrow (SST) is a United States nationally syndicated sports television show about high school athletes. The show began in 2005, when it was hosted by Bill Jones. College and National Football League television analyst Charles Davis has been hosting since 2012.

Its mission is to provide feature stories on the best prep athletes in the United States. These features highlight why these athletes are promising prospects and also shed light on who they are away from sports.

Several professional athletes were featured on the show as high school athletes.
NFL Players: Andrew Luck, Joey Bosa, Nick Bosa, Anthony Barr, Jared Goff, Deshaun Watson, Jadeveon Clowney, Kyler Murray
NBA Players: John Wall, Karl-Anthony Towns, Zion Williamson, Kevin Love, Kyrie Irving, Kevin Durant
Athletes in other sports: Missy Franklin, Brittney Griner, Mallory Pugh, Jack Flaherty, Kaleena Mosqueda-Lewis, Tatyana McFadden

The show is produced by Gameday Productions, a private television production company based in Fort Worth, Texas.

E/I compliance
Both Sports Stars of Tomorrow comply with U.S. educational children's programming guidelines and can be counted toward the minimum three weekly hours of educational programming each station must air. AMGTV, World Harvest Television, Stadium and CTN Lifestyle all carry Sports Stars of Tomorrow and/or Future Phenoms on their network feeds as part of their educational program requirements.

Awards

 The Telly Awards - 2017 - Bronze - TV Shows/Segments
 Aurora Awards - 2017 - Gold - Sports Related
 Aurora Awards - 2017 - Gold - Broadcast: Feature Story - Ian Green

References

American sports television series
2005 American television series debuts
First-run syndicated television programs in the United States